Gharnatah or al-Ghajar ( also known as Ghajar Amir) is a village in northern Syria, administratively part of the Rastan District, located north of Homs. According to the Syria Central Bureau of Statistics (CBS), Gharnatah had a population of 5,366 in the 2004 census. Its inhabitants are predominantly Sunni Muslims of Turkmen descent.

References

Populated places in al-Rastan District
Turkmen communities in Syria